The Belmont property was a subdivided strip of land on the eastern side of Chevy Chase, Maryland, along Wisconsin Avenue. In 1906, a group of African American investors acquired the parcel and sold lots to other African Americans, in an effort to develop a high-end suburb for D.C.'s sizable Black middle class. Had the project succeeded, it would have been one of the earliest modern suburbs developed for African Americans.

The scheme met hostility from white residents of Friendship Heights, Somerset, and Drummond. Ultimately, the landowner who had assembled the plot, the Chevy Chase Land Company, was able to prevent the African American group from conveying the land to their purchasers, triggering their financial collapse and foreclosure in 1909. 

In 1926, Land Company executives had the subdivision extinguished from the property books of Montgomery County, Maryland. They incorporated part of the land into Chevy Chase Section 1A. The remaining portion, immediately abutting Wisconsin Avenue was redeveloped decades later as a Saks Fifth Avenue, 2 Wisconsin Circle, and a shopping center called The Collection at Chevy Chase.

History 
The Belmont property was purchased in 1903 by Ralph P. Barnard and Guy H. Johnson, Washington lawyers who served as trustees for a syndicate consisting of themselves and two bankers, R. Golden Donaldson and Frank P. Reeside. The group entered into a deed of trust with the Union Trust Bank to secure a loan from the Chevy Chase Land Company. On November 14, 1904, they paid off their debt, and in return, Union Trust released 20 Belmont lots to Reeside in trust for Barnard, Johnson, and Donaldson. In 1906, Barnard and Johnson hired Harry M. Martin to market lots.  

But just months later, they sold the entire property on June 23, 1906, to William J. Sheetz, a white mechanical engineer who was acting as a straw buyer for a group of four Black investors: Alexander L. Satterwhite, James L. Neill, Michel O. Dumas, and Charles S. Cuney. Satterwhite and Dumas immediately bought the land on behalf of the Belmont Syndicate, the four investors' trust agreement to purchase and share the profits of Belmont. 

On July 1, 1906, an advertisement for the Belmont property appeared in the Washington Post. "Colored People Attention", it said, inviting African Americans to invest in "an ideal suburban lot in the most beautiful and most rapidly improving section of Northwest Washington, Belmont Chevy Chase."  The ad proclaimed Belmont "the only good subdivision in Washington where colored people are welcomed to buy."

Within days, the surrounding area's white neighbors rose in opposition. On July 5, the Washington Times reported that residents of Friendship Heights, Drummond, Somerset, and Bethesda were taking up arms to stop the sale of plots to Black people. The following day, the New York Times wrote that the Belmont owners had given options on some lots to Black purchasers, which "has awakened the white property owners to the danger that menaces them in having a negro colony touching elbows with them and sharing the pretty suburban trolley that runs out along the crest of the Heights from Chevy Chase to Rockville." Richard M. Ough, a builder in Friendship Heights, said that "no negro shall ever build a house in Belmont….White men certainly cannot be expected to endure it—and we shall not endure it." Ough said he and others would organize in violent protest, though no such protest is known to have occurred.

This was the first of many times that the Belmont Syndicate would face opposition.

On Sunday, July 15, Satterwhite was arrested by the town marshal of Somerset for selling real estate without a license, which carried a fine of up to $30,000. Six days later, Satterwhite appeared before James Loughborough, a local justice of the peace. Satterwhite was acquitted with the help of his attorney, Thomas Dawson, who argued that because Satterwhite owned the Belmont property, he was well within his right to sell it without a license.

Almost immediately, Satterwhite was arrested for a second time by the marshal, this time for selling land on a Sunday. He was once again acquitted by Judge Loughborough.

Legal challenges eventually forced the Syndicate to sell the Belmont property. In the April 17, 1907, edition of the Evening Star, Dr. Zeno B. Babbitt announced that he had made an agreement to buy Belmont. Within a month, and without telling the other members of the Syndicate, Satterwhite sold his shares in the Belmont lands to Ewell J. Nevitt and entered into a trust agreement with Babbitt.

Meanwhile, Dumas and his lawyer collected all the necessary items to release lots under the Second Deed of Trust, one of which was a deed of release to be signed by Reeside and Donaldson. Barnard, Johnson, Reeside, and Donaldson refused to release the lot from their possession. Due to the terms of purchase, other parties such as the Chevy Chase Land Company and the Union Trust Bank were allowed to deny the land's release.

On June 20, 1907, Dumas filed a lawsuit naming all of the people and corporations engaged in the Belmont land transactions up until 1907 as defendants. The suit and subsequent suits for the next decade proved to be unfruitful, ending in a stalemate over 20 lots. The four men then went their separate ways and the Belmont Syndicate was dissolved. 

Twenty years later, the Chevy Chase Land Company petitioned the court to erase a subdivision called Belmont from the Montgomery County property books, following a settlement with a Howard University trustee named Michel O. Dumas."

Related topics
Early African American suburbs
 Deanwood, Washington, D.C. 
 Glenarden, Maryland, founded c. 1911
 Fairmount Heights, Maryland, 
 Lincoln, Maryland, founded 1908. 
 Morgan Park, Baltimore
 Wilson Park, Baltimore
 Frederick Douglass Court, developed by Maggie L. Walker in Richmond, Virginia.

References

External links

 Video lecture: Belmont: The Lost Plan for a Black Chevy Chase, retrieved July 20, 2021. 

1906 establishments in Maryland
African-American history of Montgomery County, Maryland
Chevy Chase, Maryland
Sundown towns in Maryland